Icaricia lupini, the lupine blue, is a butterfly of the family Lycaenidae. It is found from south-western Canada, south through much of mountainous and intermountain western United States and high plains to northern Mexico.

The wingspan is 22–29 mm. Adults are on wing from June to August in one generation in the Sierra Nevada of eastern California. Elsewhere, there are several generations from March to July.

The larvae feed on Eriogonum umbellatum and Eriogonum fasciculatum. Adults feed on flower nectar.

The hairs of the caterpillars can cause skin irritation (urticaria).

Subspecies
Icaricia lupini lupini (California)
Icaricia lupini monticola (California)
Icaricia lupini chlorina
Icaricia lupini texanus (Arizona)
Icaricia lupini argentata (California)

External links

Profile at Butterflies and Moths of North America

Icaricia
Butterflies of North America
Fauna of the California chaparral and woodlands
Butterflies described in 1869